Zéaglo is a town in western Ivory Coast. It is a sub-prefecture of Bloléquin Department in Cavally Region, Montagnes District.

Zéaglo was a commune until March 2012, when it became one of 1126 communes nationwide that were abolished.

In 2014, the population of the sub-prefecture of Zéaglo was 18,664.

Villages
The six villages of the sub-prefecture of Zéaglo and their population in 2014 are:
 Béoué (2 743)
 Douandrou (2 429)
 Pohan (602)
 Zéaglo (12 245)
 Ziglo (645)

References

Sub-prefectures of Cavally Region
Former communes of Ivory Coast